Kinjarapu Atchannaidu is an Indian politician from Andhra Pradesh. He is serving as the Member of the Legislative Assembly (MLA) representing the Tekkali constituency from the Telugu Desam Party (TDP) since 2014. He is the chief of TDP for the state of Andhra Pradesh since October 2020.

Political career 
Atchannaidu was elected as an MLA from the Harishchandrapuram constituency in three consecutive elections: 1996 by-poll, 1999 and 2004. Following the reorganization and dissolution of the Harishchandrapuram constituency, he contested and lost the 2009 elections for the Tekkali constituency. He also lost the immediate by-poll in 2009 that occurred due to the death of the elected MLA. He was elected back in the 2014 and 2019 elections from the Tekkali constituency.

He held the portfolio of Transport Ministry during the Third N. Chandrababu Naidu ministry.

Personal life 
He is the brother of Kinjarapu Yerran Naidu and uncle of Ram Mohan Naidu Kinjarapu.

References

External links 
 

Telugu people
People from Srikakulam district
Third N. Chandrababu Naidu Cabinet (2014–2019)
Telugu Desam Party politicians
Andhra Pradesh MLAs 1994–1999
Andhra Pradesh MLAs 1999–2004
Andhra Pradesh MLAs 2004–2009
Andhra Pradesh MLAs 2014–2019
Andhra Pradesh MLAs 2019–2024
Living people
Year of birth missing (living people)